Coenogonium urceolatum is a rare species of corticlous (bark-dwelling), crustose lichen in the family Coenogoniaceae. Found in western Tasmania, it was formally described as a new species in 2018 by lichenologists Gintaras Kantvilas, Eimy Rivas Plata, and Robert Lücking. It is only known from the type collection. The species epithet refers to its characteristic small, urn-shaped, orange apothecia.

References

Gyalectales
Lichen species
Lichens described in 2018
Lichens of Australia
Taxa named by Gintaras Kantvilas
Taxa named by Robert Lücking